Jason Zimbler (born July 27, 1977) is an American software designer and former actor.

Early life and education
Born in New York City, Zimbler graduated from the University of Notre Dame in 1998, and has both an undergraduate degree in business administration and a graduate degree in theatre directing.

In 1992, Zimbler spoke in front of the United States House of Representatives' United States House Select Committee on Children, Youth, and Families, discussing issues concerning free condom distribution in school and the images of today's heroes.

Career
, Zimbler is employed by HBO as a software designer.

Television
Zimbler appeared on The Edge of Night and co-starred in the Nickelodeon television program Clarissa Explains It All from 1991 to 1994 as the character Ferguson W. Darling;  The Portland Mercurys Alison Hallett opined that it is this latter role—as "the world’s brattiest little brother"—for which Zimbler is best known.  In 2007, Zimbler joined other past Nickelodeon stars (Danny Cooksey, Michael Maronna, and Marc Summers) in the music video for The XYZ Affair's "All My Friends".

Theatre
Zimbler played Robert Anderson in the 1989 revival of Shenandoah.  Since then he has directed and assisted theatre productions in New York City, including frequent participation with the Impetuous Theater Group.  Zimbler received the 2006 Stage Directors and Choreographers Society's Observership for Burleigh Grime$, and was chosen to take part in the 2007 Lincoln Center for the Performing Arts' Director's Lab.  Additionally, the director has been an educator and theatre program head at Buck's Rock Performing and Creative Arts Camp for eight years.

In late 2007, Jason Zimbler and Sam Kusnetz founded the theatre company The Re-Theatre Instrument in Portland, Oregon.  Under Zimbler's direction, The Re-Theatre Instrument has re-imagined such classic works as Faust, King Lear and Much Ado About Nothing.

References

External links
 
 

American male stage actors
American male television actors
American theatre directors
Living people
1977 births
Mendoza College of Business alumni
American male child actors
Male actors from New York City
20th-century American male actors
21st-century American male actors
HBO people
Notre Dame College of Arts and Letters alumni